Fisantekraal is a township in the Western Cape province of South Africa. According to the 2011 census it has a population of 12,369 people.

There is an airfield nearby by the same name, Fisantekraal Airfield.

References

Populated places in the City of Cape Town